Julius Wilhelm Graebner (11 January 1858 - July 25, 1917) was a German architect. He had his main creative phase in the Dresden architecture firm Schilling & Graebner in the three decades from 1889 until his death.

Life and work
Born in Baden, he was the son of an undressed hosiery and first attended high school in Karlsruhe . Between 1876 and 1879 he then began studying architecture at the technical college there, which he had to interrupt due to military service and continued in Dresden at the Polytechnic in 1880 . There he met Rudolf Schilling , who would later become his partner in a joint architectural office. After completing his training, during which he worked particularly through his professors Josef Durm, Karl Weißbach and Ernst Giese was influenced, he went to Berlin in 1883 . Back in Dresden, he teamed up with his former classmates Schilling in 1889 the office Schilling & Graebner. Together, they created primarily in Saxony a variety initially historical buildings, then at the Art Nouveau and the reform architecture of the early Modern oriented churches, villas, Town halls and other buildings. Graebner, who was promoted to royal building council in 1909, was closely connected with the city building councilor Hans Erlwein and with Ferdinand Avenarius , for whom he also designed a villa in Blasewitz.

Julius Wilhelm Graebner died in 1917 during a business trip in what is now Istanbul to typhoid. His son Erwin Graebner, after returning from the front of the First World War in October 1918, continued the architecture firm Schilling & Graebner together with Schilling. Julius Graebner was buried at the Melaten cemetery in Cologne.

Major works
See Schilling & Graebner

Available literature

References

1858 births
1917 deaths
19th-century architects
People from Baden
Art Nouveau architects